Frederick Hockley (1809 – 10 November 1885) was a British occultist and scryer who was a London-based Freemason and a member of the Societas Rosicruciana in Anglia.

Career

Hockley avidly collected and transcribed over many years a vast library of important occult books, works and texts, including a Rosicrucian manuscript belonging to Sigismund Bacstrom, who was initiated into an occult society in Mauritius in 1794. This text had a great influence on British occultism.

He established the spiritualist Croydon Circle in 1853, in which he claimed to be in communication with a group of spirits controlled by the Crowned Angel of the Seventh Sphere. This predated the first spiritualist organization in London, known as the Charing Cross Spirit Circle formed in January, 1857.

Scrying
Hockley practiced the art of 'crystallomancy' or 'the art of invocating spirits by the crystal' and believed this to be one of the most important forms of spirit communication. He kept notes on many of his experiments and experiences, accumulating a vast amount of information.

It is said that through close knit London circles, his freemasonry connections and SRIA connections, as well as the extensive and vast library he left behind him on his passing that he contributed to the forming and curriculum of 'The Hermetic Order of the Golden Dawn'. It is also alleged that the original cipher manuscript on which the Golden Dawn was formed may well have been written by Hockley.

Rosicrucians
Hockley was a close friend of Kenneth R. H. Mackenzie and other British Rosicrucians and occultists of his period. He was purportedly a pupil of Francis Barrett, author of The Magus (1801).

In March, 1884 he joined the London Spiritualist Alliance.

Hockley died on 10 November 1885.

Books
The Rosicrucian Seer, 1986 and 2009
A Complete Book of Magic Science, 2008
Solomon's Clavis or Key to Unlock the Mysteries of Magic, 2008
Occult Spells - A Nineteenth Century Grimoire, 2009
The Clavis or Key to the Magic of Solomon, 2009
Invocating by Magic Crystals and Mirrors, 2010
Journal of a Rosicrucian Philosopher, 2010
Abraham the Jew on Magic Talismans, 2011
A Book of the Offices of Spirits, 2011
Clavis Arcana Magica, 2012
Experimentum, Potens Magna in Occult Philosophy, 2012
Dr. Rudd's Nine Hierarchies of Angels, 2013
Ars Notoria - The Notary Art of Solomon, 2015
The Pauline Art of Solomon, 2016
Mr. Yardley's Process, 2016 Éditions Les Trois R
The Clavis or Key to Unlock the Mysteries of Magic, 2019
Book of Good Angels, 2019

References 

 Hockley, Frederick. The Rosicrucian Seer: Magical Writings of Frederick Hockley. Wellingborough, England: Aquarian Press, 1986.
 King, Francis. The Rites of Modern Occult Magic New York: Macmillan, 1970.
 Description of Mr. Yardley's Process, on Éditions Les Trois R website.

External links
 No. 14, Vol. 2. Vernal Equinox 2008 - Frederick Hockley: A Hidden Force behind the 19th Century English Occult Revival

1809 births
1885 deaths
British occult writers
British spiritualists
Rosicrucians